The Bow can refer to:

The Bow (film), a 2005 Korean film
The Bow (skyscraper), a building in Calgary, Alberta
The Bow River, a river in the Canadian province of Alberta
The Bow Back Rivers, part of the River Lea in east London

See also 
Bow (disambiguation)